Huguette Jullien is a French curler.

At the international level, she competed for France on seven  and seven  championships.

Teams

References

External links

Living people
French female curlers
Date of birth missing (living people)
Place of birth missing (living people)
Year of birth missing (living people)